Leon, also known as Léon, (t)erreur de la savane, is a French series of CGI-animated episodes produced by Studio Hari for children's television. The series features Leon, a perseverant but clumsy lion, and a host of other animal characters living in the African savannah, including an elusive springbok and Leon's rival, a spotted hyena. The three-minute episodes feature no dialogue, and have been broadcast around the world.

List of episodes
 Hide and Seek
 Medium Rare
 Poached Egg
 Big Crush
 High Pitched
 Hypnotised
 Match Point
 Twister
 Magnetised
 Safari Rally
 Popy's Super
 Leon Says
 Carbon Copy
 Mecano Giraffe
 Paranoia
 Scratchy Itchy
 As Seen on TV
 Bellydancing Witchcraft
 Toady Talk
 High Jump
 Two's Company
 The King of Laughter
 Guard Croc
 Beautiful Creature
 Youth Serum
 4 × 400 m
 Go Fetch
 Clone Impact
 Hunger Strike
 Masks Off
 Electroshock
 Cafe Frappe
 Alien Lion
 Safari Photo
 Love Story
 The Rookie
 Dandelion
 Pygmalion
 Super Springbok
 It's a Dog's Life
 Alligator Clip
 A Wagon Made for Two
 Heavy Load
 Practical Joker
 Squatters
 Magic Potion
 Nature Reserve
 Dungbeetle
 Open Bar
 The Great Illusion
 War of the Tongues
 On Off
 Angry Aardvark

External links
 Official website

2000s French animated television series
French children's animated comedy television series
French computer-animated television series
Animated television series about lions
Animated television series without speech